Budinarci is a village in North Macedonia. It is located in the Berovo Municipality.

Demographics
According to the 2002 census, the village had a total of 682 inhabitants. Ethnic groups in the village include:

Macedonians 681
Serbs 1

References

Villages in Berovo Municipality